Gregorio Fontana, born Giovanni Battista Lorenzo Fontana (7 December 1735 – 24 August 1803) was an Italian mathematician and a religious of the Piarist order. He was chair of mathematics at the university of Pavia succeeding Roger Joseph Boscovich. He has been credited with the introduction of polar coordinates.

His brother was the physicist Felice Fontana (1730–1805).

Works

References

Academic staff of the University of Pavia
18th-century Italian mathematicians
1735 births
1803 deaths
Fellows of the Royal Society